Veselé may refer to places:

Veselé (Děčín District), a municipality and village in the Czech Republic
Veselé, Slovakia, a municipality and village in Slovakia

See also
Veselý
Veselá (disambiguation)
Veselí (disambiguation)